Sekili, historically Orul, is a town in the Nizip District, Gaziantep Province, Turkey. The town was inhabited by Armenians until the Armenian genocide as well as some Turkmens. The village is inhabited by Turkmens from the Barak tribe.

References

Villages in Nizip District
Former Armenian communities in Turkey